Hoeneodes is a genus of snout moths described by Rolf-Ulrich Roesler in 1969.

Species
 Hoeneodes sinensis (Caradja & Meyrick, 1937)
 Hoeneodes vittatella (Ragonot, 1887)

References

Phycitinae